Elophila scitalis is a moth in the family Crambidae. It was described by Charles Swinhoe in 1885. It is found in India.

References

Acentropinae
Moths described in 1885
Moths of Asia